Iman Khatib-Yasin (born 23 October 1964) is an Israeli Arab social worker and politician. A member of the United Arab List party, she was first elected to the Knesset in 2020 as a member of the Joint List, becoming the first woman from the United Arab List and the first hijab-wearing woman elected to  the Knesset.

Biography
Born in Arraba, Khatib-Yasin studied for a bachelor's degree in social work at the University of Haifa and a master's degree in women's affairs at Tel Aviv University. She also graduated from the Mandel College for Leadership. She was employed as a social worker, and ran a community centre in Yafa an-Naseriyye.

A member of the Southern Branch of the Islamic Movement and its political wing, the United Arab List, Khatib-Yasin was placed ninth on the United Arab List–Balad list for the April 2019 elections, but the alliance won only four seats. Prior to the September 2019 elections, the United Arab List joined the Joint List alliance, with Khatib-Yasin given the fifteenth slot on the list. However, the Joint List won thirteen seats. She was given fifteenth place again for the March 2020 elections and was elected to the Knesset as the alliance won fifteen seats. In the 2021 Israeli legislative election she was fifth on the United Arab List, but the list won only four seats. However, she returned to the Knesset in August 2021 after the death of one of the party's MKs, Said al-Harumi. She was re-elected in the 2022 legislative election.

Khatib-Yasin lives in Yafa an-Naseriyye in the Lower Galilee and has four children.

References

External links

1964 births
Living people
21st-century Israeli politicians
Arab members of the Knesset
Islamic Movement in Israel politicians
Israeli Muslims
Israeli social workers
Joint List politicians
Members of the 23rd Knesset (2020–2021)
Members of the 24th Knesset (2021–2022)
Members of the 25th Knesset (2022–)
People from Arraba, Israel
Tel Aviv University alumni
United Arab List politicians
University of Haifa alumni
Women members of the Knesset